Tiruvaikal Vaikalnathar Temple is a Hindu temple located at  Mayiladuthurai district of Tamil Nadu, India. The presiding deity is Shiva. He is called as Vaigalnathar (Shenbaga Aranyeswarar). His consort is Kombial Kothai (Shaka Komalavalli).

Significance 
It is one of the shrines of the 275 Paadal Petra Sthalams. Thirunavukkarasar have sung hymns in praise of the temple.

References 
 
 

Shiva temples in Mayiladuthurai district
Padal Petra Stalam